Michelle Gayle is the debut album by British R&B-soul singer Michelle Gayle, released in 1994 by RCA Records of BMG UK. The album was produced and co-written in parts by Narada Michael Walden who had previously worked with artists such as Whitney Houston. According to the sleeve notes of the single "Sweetness", the album was originally scheduled to be titled "Walk with Pride".

The album includes Gayle's biggest hit single "Sweetness", which reached  4 on the UK Singles Chart, along with four other UK top-40 singles; "Looking Up" (No. 11), "I'll Find You" (No. 26), "Freedom" (No. 16) and "Happy Just to Be with You" (No. 11). "Happy Just to Be with You" was remixed for single release; this version features on Gayle's second album, Sensational.

Track listing
"Get Off My Back" (Ronnie Wilson, Dennis Charles, Michelle Gayle) - 4:09
"Happy Just to Be with You" (Narada Michael Walden, Gayle, Preston Glass) - 4:35
"Walk with Pride" (Gayle, Ronnie Wilson, Dennis Charles) - 4:01
"Looking Up" (Dave James, J. Rawe) - 4:33
"Girlfriend" (Dave James, Gayle) - 4:10
"Freedom" (Narada Michael Walden, S.J. Dakota) - 4:08
"Personality" (Gayle, T. Morris) - 3:49
"I'll Find You" (Steve Jervier, Jonathan Wales, Paul Jervier) - 5:32
"Your Love" (Dave James, Gayle) - 5:10
"Sweetness" (Narada Michael Walden, Preston Glass) - 3:36
"One Day" (Steve Jervier, Jonathan Wales, Paul Jervier) - 3:45
"Say What's on Your Mind" (Wilson, Charles, Gayle) - 3:44
"Rise Up" Blacksmith Remix (Simon Climie) - 3:39
"Baby Don't Go" (Narada Michael Walden, Gayle, S.J. Dakota) - 5:03
"All Night Long" (Narada Michael Walden, Michael Mani, Monty Steward) - 4:42

Charts

References

1994 debut albums
RCA Records albums
Michelle Gayle albums
Albums produced by Narada Michael Walden